Walter Berry was the speaker of Legislative Assembly of Prince Edward Island from 1780 to 1784.
Berry was a slaveholder during the colonial era.

References

Speakers of the Legislative Assembly of Prince Edward Island
Members of the Legislative Council of Prince Edward Island
18th-century Canadian politicians
Year of birth uncertain
Year of death uncertain
Colony of Prince Edward Island people
Canadian slave owners